Good Trouble is an American drama television series. It is a spin-off of the Freeform show The Fosters. Good Trouble  began in January 2019 with a thirteen-episode first season and follows Callie Adams Foster (Maia Mitchell) and Mariana Adams Foster (Cierra Ramirez), conceptually a few years after the earlier series, "as they embark on the next phase of their young adult lives working in Los Angeles." The second season premiered in June 2019, and the third season premiered in February 2021. In September 2021, the series was renewed for a fourth season, which premiered on March 9, 2022. In August 2022, the series was renewed for a fifth season, which premiered on March 16, 2023.

Plot
Taking place a few years after the events of The Fosters, Adams Foster siblings Callie and Mariana relocate to Los Angeles to begin the next phase of their lives. As they move into a communal living apartment building called The Coterie, Callie becomes a law clerk working for Judge Wilson while Mariana becomes a software engineer. The two of them navigate their young adult lives while interacting with their neighbors and the people they befriend.

Cast and characters

 Maia Mitchell as Callie Adams Foster (seasons 14, special guest season 5), a recent graduate of UCSD Law School and Mariana's adopted sister. She leaves to join the ACLU in Washington, D.C. in the second episode of season 4, though she has spoken to Mariana occasionally through web chat.
 Cierra Ramirez as Mariana Adams Foster, a software engineer and Callie's adopted sister who recently graduated from MIT
 Zuri Adele as Malika Williams, a bartender and political activist who lives with Callie and Mariana in the Coterie
 Sherry Cola as Alice Kwan, the building manager of The Coterie apartment building
 Tommy Martinez as Gael Martinez, a bisexual graphic designer and artist who falls for Callie 
 Roger Bart as Judge Curtis Wilson (seasons 1–2, guest season 3), a conservative judge for whom Callie worked as a clerk
 Emma Hunton as Davia Moss (season 2–present; recurring season 1), a body-positive influencer and teacher
 Josh Pence as Dennis Cooper (season 2–present; recurring season 1), the oldest tenant in the Coterie who is an aspiring musician 
 Beau Mirchoff as Jamie Hunter (seasons 3–4; recurring seasons 1–2), a lawyer and Callie's on-again-off-again boyfriend
 Bryan Craig as Joaquin Peréz (season 4–present), a mysterious new resident to the Coterie and investigative journalist who is looking for his estranged sister Jenna
 Priscilla Quintana as Isabella Tavez (season 4; recurring seasons 2–3, 5), an aspiring actress and model
 Booboo Stewart as Luca (season 5; recurring season 4), a homeless man whom Joaquin interviews for a story and is befriended by The Coterie inhabitants

Episodes

Series overview

Season 1 (2019)

Season 2 (2019–20)

Season 3 (2021)

Season 4 (2022)

Season 5 (2023)

Production

Development
After announcing the ending of The Fosters, Freeform ordered a spin-off series of the show, featuring Callie Adams Foster and Mariana Adams Foster living in Los Angeles five years after the series finale of the parent show. It was given a 13-episode order. On December 10, 2018, it was reported that the California Film Commission had approved $6.6 million of tax credits for a potential second season should Freeform decide to renew the series. On February 5, 2019, the series was renewed for a second season which premiered on June 18, 2019. On January 17, 2020, Freeform renewed the series for a third season which premiered on February 17, 2021. On September 8, 2021, Freeform renewed the series for a fourth season which premiered on March 9, 2022. On August 2, 2022, Freeform renewed the series for a fifth season which premiered on March 16, 2023.

Casting
On June 11, 2018, Tommy Martinez, Zuri Adele, Sherry Cola, and Roger Bart were cast in regular roles as Gael, Malika, Alice, Judge Wilson respectively. Additionally, Emma Hunton and Ken Kirby were cast in recurring roles as Davia and Benjamin. On November 6, 2019, Shannon Chan-Kent was cast in a recurring role for the second season. On January 24, 2020, Priscilla Quintana joined the cast in a recurring capacity for the second season. On January 28, 2021, Marcus Emanuel Mitchell and Jayson Blair were cast in recurring roles for the third season. On March 3, 2021, Catherine Haena Kim and Craig Parker joined the cast in recurring capacities for the third season. On August 16, 2021, Odelya Halevi was cast in a recurring role for the third season. On February 7, 2022, Quintana was promoted to series regular while Bryan Craig joined the cast as a new series regular and Booboo Stewart was cast in a recurring capacity for the fourth season. On February 24, 2022, Yasmine Aker was cast to replace Halevi in a recasting.

Maia Mitchell later stepped down from her role and her position as an executive producer in order to be with her family in Australia. Her character's final appearance was in the second episode of season four. She will return as a guest star in season 5.

Filming
Principal production on season 1 commenced on June 11, 2018.

Reception

Critical reception
On the review aggregation website Rotten Tomatoes, the series holds an approval rating of 100% with an average rating of 8.93/10, based on 13 reviews. The website's critical consensus reads, "Good Trouble is a spinoff that leaves the nest and takes graceful flight, bringing a deft comedic touch to the trials and tribulations facing Generation Z." Metacritic, which uses a weighted average, assigned the series a score of 83 out of 100 based on 4 critics, indicating "universal acclaim."

Ratings

Season 1

Season 2

Season 3

Season 4

Accolades

Notes

References

External links
 

2019 American television series debuts
2010s American drama television series
2010s American LGBT-related drama television series
2020s American drama television series
2020s American LGBT-related drama television series
American television spin-offs
English-language television shows
The Fosters (American TV series)
Freeform (TV channel) original programming
Television series about families
Television shows set in Los Angeles
Television series by Disney–ABC Domestic Television